Sir Edward James Gent  (28 October 1895 – 4 July 1948) was the first appointed Governor of the Malayan Union in 1946. He was most famous for heading early British attempts to crush a pro-independence uprising in Malaya led by the Malayan Communist Party during the Malayan Emergency, before dying during the first year of the war in an aviation accident.

Life

Gent was born in 1895 was the son of John Gent (1844–1927) and Harriet ( Frankland) Randall. His original name was Gerard Edward James Gent, but he changed it to Edward James Gent, the reasons for which were unknown. He was educated at The King's School, Canterbury, and Trinity College, Oxford.

Gent married Guendolen Mary Wyeth in 1923, and they had four children, Marcus James Gent, Gerard Nicholas Gent, Ann Monica Gent and Janice Mary Gent.

Military career
Gent served with the Duke of Cornwall's Light Infantry in the First World War in Flanders and Italy. He was wounded twice and was awarded the Military Cross in 1917 and the Distinguished Service Order in 1919.

Diplomatic career 

He was the first appointed Governor of the Malayan Union, Sir Edward also became the first Colonial Administrator to discuss openly to form a better government for the future of Malaya, where later the Federation of Malaya was established. 

He was an instrumental figure in the formation of the Malayan Union which was established on 1 April 1946 in Kuala Lumpur, and the first Governor of the Malayan Union.

When Malaysia achieved independence (Merdeka) from the United Kingdom, his widow Lady Gent, together with Lady Gurney, were invited to the ceremony as guests of honour.

Malayan Emergency 

Gent remained as the High Commissioner for Malaya when the Malayan Union was dissolved and replaced by the Federation of Malaya. But he did not remain at his post for long. He was sacked by the Colonial Office and recalled to London on 29 June 1948 at the onset of the Malayan Emergency after Malcolm MacDonald, the British Commissioner-General for Southeast Asia, lobbied Whitehall. 

Gent disbelieved the communists were of any threat and refused to act. When the communists first launched its attacks on Malayan rubber estates, Gent on 16 June declared emergency in parts of Perak and Johor only, much to the rubber planters' disappointment whom demanded for a nationwide declaration. Gent was only forced to widen the declaration to the whole of Malaya the next day when the Straits Times wrote "Govern or Get Out" on its front page and thus galvanising public sentiment against him.

Death

Gent was returning to the United Kingdom in an Avro York transport aircraft of the Royal Air Force when it collided with a Douglas DC-6 of Scandinavian Airlines System near Northwood, north London, a week after he was recalled to London.

 |
 |

Notes

References
Gent Family History

1895 births
1948 deaths
Colonial Administrative Service officers
Administrators in British Malaya
Victims of aviation accidents or incidents in England
Alumni of Trinity College, Oxford
People educated at The King's School, Canterbury
Duke of Cornwall's Light Infantry officers
Officers of the Order of the British Empire
Recipients of the Military Cross
Companions of the Distinguished Service Order
Knights Commander of the Order of St Michael and St George
People from Kingston upon Thames
British Army personnel of World War I
Military personnel from London